Lustra is a town and comune in the province of Salerno, in the Campania region of south-western Italy.

Geography
The municipality borders with Laureana Cilento, Omignano, Perdifumo, Perito, Rutino, Salento, Sessa Cilento and Torchiara. It counts the frazioni of Corticelle, Monacelli, Ponti Rossi, Rocca Cilento and Selva Cilento.

See also
Cilento

References

External links

Cities and towns in Campania
Localities of Cilento